Words That Go Unspoken, Deeds That Go Undone is the fourth studio album by English extreme metal band Akercocke. It was released independently on October 10, 2005, and on February 7, 2006 through Earache Records. This album is the first Akercocke release not to feature the original line-up of the band, with Matt Wilcock (ex-The Berzerker) instead of Paul Scanlan on guitar; though the majority of the material was co-written with Paul Scanlan before he was fired.

Limited Edition 

A limited two-disc CD-DVD edition of the album was released, featuring behind the scenes footage of the band during the making of the album as well as a brief documentary thereof.

Track listing

Personnel
Akercocke
Jason Mendonça – guitars, vocals
Matt Wilcock – guitars
Peter Theobalds – bass
David Gray – drums

Production
Akercocke – recording, production
Neil Kernon – mixing
Alan Douches – mastering

Artwork
Peter Theobalds – layout, cover
Sam Scott-Hunter – photography

References

External links 

 
 

Akercocke albums
Earache Records albums
2005 albums